The Albis is a chain of hills in the Canton of Zürich, Switzerland, stretching for some 19 km from Sihlbrugg in the south to Waldegg near Zürich in the north.  The chain forms, among others, the border between the Affoltern and Horgen districts. The best known point is Uetliberg at 870 m, overlooking the city of Zürich.  Other points of interest include the Albishorn (909m.) the Bürglen (also known as Bürglenstutz, the highest peak, 914.6m.), the Schnabelburg, an observation tower, the Albis Pass, the small town of Buechenegg, and the extensive woods (known as the Sihlwald forest) on both sides of the river Sihl.  The Sihl Valley borders the Albis chain on its entire east side.  On the west side, the Albis is bordered by various streams (including the Reppisch) and one lake, the Türlersee.

The chain is mostly wooded, but also has extensive fields, often reaching to the summit, some cultivated, some used as pastures for cows or sheep.  Being very near Zürich, the area is heavily visited, especially near its northern end, and includes many restaurants along the summit (from Uetliberg to Albishorn), well-maintained trails and dirt roads, a railroad (the Uetlibergbahn) from Zürich, and a cable car (Felseneggbahn) from Adliswil to Felsenegg.

The Albis chain was formed as the left moraine of the glacier the bed of which is now Lake Zürich.  The soil is mostly a conglomerate of gravel, some of it large, and glacial loess.  The frequently steep sides of the chain are often subject to small landslides.  As a generalization, the eastern side of the chain (overlooking Lake Zürich) tends to be steeper than the western side.

The hilltops of the Albis provided several good defensive sites, and were the locations of the castles of Uetliberg, Baldern and Schnabelburg, all of which are now ruined or lost.

Picture gallery 

Landforms of the canton of Zürich
Mountain ranges of Switzerland